Whitehall is an unincorporated community located in LaSalle Parish, Louisiana, United States.

The community is at the intersection of U.S. 80, Louisiana Highway 8 and Louisiana Highway 460. The north end of Catahoula Lake lies four miles to the south.

References

Unincorporated communities in LaSalle Parish, Louisiana
Unincorporated communities in Louisiana